Taylor Wenczkowski (born September 25, 1997) is an American ice hockey player who currently plays for the Boston Pride in the Premier Hockey Federation.

Career 
As a junior player, Wenczkowski played 72 games over three seasons for the Boston Shamrocks of the Junior Women's Hockey League. She scored 35 points in each of her last two seasons.

In 148 NCAA games over five years at the University of New Hampshire, Wenczkowski scored 82 points. As a senior she served as one of the three captains of the UNH Wildcats.

Wenczkowski was drafted in the third round of the 2020 NWHL Draft and signed a one year deal with the Boston Pride on June 23, 2020. She would win back-to-back Isobel Cup championships with the Pride in 2021 and 2022, earning the honor of Playoff MVP in the latter year.

Personal life 
Wenczkowski majored in kinesiology at the University of New Hampshire. She attended high school at the Virtual Learning Academy Charter School.

Career stats

Source

Honours 
2018-19 Led the UNH Wildcats in goals (20) and points (26) 
2015-16 Led UNH rookies in goals (4), assists (8) and points (12).
2022 Isobel Cup Playoff MVP 

Source:

References

External links
 
 
 

1997 births
Living people
American women's ice hockey forwards
Boston Pride players
New Hampshire Wildcats women's ice hockey players
Ice hockey people from New Hampshire
Premier Hockey Federation players
People from Rochester, New Hampshire
Sportspeople from Strafford County, New Hampshire